This is a chronological list of Miss Panama beauty pageants.

External links
Official Miss Panamá website

Lists of events in Panama

Lists of beauty pageants editions